The Randall Avenue Historic District is located in De Pere, Wisconsin. It was added to the State Register of Historic Places in 2006 and to the National Register of Historic Places the following year. Contributing buildings in the district were constructed from 1908 to 1955.

References

Historic districts on the National Register of Historic Places in Wisconsin
National Register of Historic Places in Brown County, Wisconsin